WLEV (100.7 FM, "100.7 WLEV") is a commercial radio station licensed to serve Allentown, Pennsylvania. The station is owned by Cumulus Media, Inc., through licensee Radio License Holding CBC LLC, and broadcasts an adult contemporary music format. 

The station covers the Lehigh Valley region of Pennsylvania.

History

100.7 frequency
100.7 FM began operation in 1947 as WFMZ. On November 1, 1947, it moved from 105.1 MHz to 95.9 MHz concurrent with an increase in power to 1 KW.

The station originally played classical and jazz music at various times of the day. In the 1950s, the station began playing blocks of instrumental easy listening music as well. In 1965, the station was sold to a Christian local group called Maranatha Broadcasting. At that point, WFMZ flipped to a religious/easy listening format. For many hours daily, the station sold blocks of time to churches. The rest of the day was filled with only instrumental easy listening music known as "Beautiful Music". The station initially played no vocalists.

In the 1970s, WFMZ began cutting back the religious programming to very early mornings and middays and late evenings. The station began to focus more on the easy listening music. By the mid 1970s, the station added some soft vocals by standard and adult contemporary artists; they began playing one or two per hour. In 1976, Maranatha signed on as television station Channel 69. That station became known as WFMZ-TV, as the FM station was now WFMZ FM. The television station ran mostly religious shows along with about 6 hours a day of classic sitcoms and drama shows.

In the 1980s, WFMZ FM continued with the beautiful music format cutting the religious shows down to a couple hours a day at most. A boost in the ratings occurred when WQQQ dropped easy listening for Top 40 in 1983. WFMZ FM began gradually mixing in more vocalists and began playing about four an hour by 1987. By 1990, they were about half vocal and half instrumental. In 1991, the station overhauled the format and dropped most of the standards artists and focused on soft hits from popular AC and CHR artists. The station was now mostly vocal with an instrumental each hour. By 1994, WFMZ evolved completely into a Soft Adult Contemporary format.

Maranatha put WFMZ FM up for sale in 1996. Citadel Broadcasting bought them late that year. They already owned AC station WLEV on 96.1. The rumor was they would flip WFMZ FM to country. Upon closing though, both stations remained AC outlets with WFMZ being softer.

In the summer of 1997, it was determined that Allentown only needed one adult contemporary station. A country station was also needed. So, in July 1997, 96.1 WLEV became a country music station. The call letters were changed to WCTO and they became "Cat Country 96". Half of the WLEV 96.1 airstaff remained on 96.1 and many new airstaffers were hired to carry out the country format.

100.7 FM had only a couple of air staffers and was mostly automated. The staffers who did not stay on 96.1 moved to fill daytime hours on 100.7. The WLEV call letters also moved to 100.7. The intellectual properties of 96.1 WLEV and 100.7 WFMZ FM were combined onto 100.7. The format overall became a straight Adult contemporary format. The religious shows were taken off. Delilah's love songs' show was added in the 7 p.m. to midnight time slot. Citadel's 1400 WEST was sold to Maranatha Broadcasting.

WLEV intellectual unit
WLEV began in 1947 as WEST-FM on 96.1. For decades the station simulcast WEST's Middle Of The Road Popular Music format. In 1973, though, 96.1 became WLEV and began offering a Soft Rock/Adult Contemporary format that was very automated. They played the softer rock hits of the 1960s and 1970s along with a lot of current product. They were known as "Hit Parade Music" at one point. The station was owned by Sound Media and then by Telemedia Group.

Through the 1970s and into the 1980s, WLEV 96.1 continued as a straight-ahead adult contemporary station with no dramatic changes. More personalities were added in the late 1980s. By the 1990s, the station bordered on being a Hot AC. But the texture of the station was consistent.

In 1995, the station was sold, along with WEST, to Citadel Broadcasting. Still, the format remained Adult Contemporary. In 1997, Citadel acquired WFMZ FM, which by then had a format that was evolving to be musically closer to WLEV. In 1997, it was decided that there was no need for two AC stations, so they combined aspects of the AC formats from both stations and moved the WLEV calls, format, and some of the air staff to 100.7 that July.

96.1 became Cat Country WCTO playing a country music format. As a country music station, the station achieves some very high ratings. The station has a live air staff almost full-time. The station focuses on Country hits from the 1980s through present.

WLEV competes today with WBEB and WODE-FM as adult listening radio stations. Citadel merged with Cumulus Media on September 16, 2011.

Signal note
WLEV is short-spaced to two other Class B stations operating on 100.7 MHz: WZBA 100.7 The Bay (licensed to serve Westminster, Maryland) and WZXL 100.7 ZXL (licensed to serve Wildwood, New Jersey). The distance between WLEV's transmitter and WZBA's transmitter is only , while the distance between WLEV's transmitter and WZXL's transmitter is only , as determined by FCC rules. The minimum distance between two Class B stations operating on the same channel according to current FCC rules is 150 miles.

HD programming and translators
W257DI (Loud 99.3) began broadcasting a Rhythmic CHR format in Reading on August 18, 2017, branding as "Reading's Hip Hop Station." However, on January 17, 2022, Loud 99.3 moved to 98.5 FM.

See also
Media in the Lehigh Valley

References

External links

1947 establishments in Pennsylvania
Cumulus Media radio stations
Radio stations established in 1947
LEV